Svinoy, Sangi-Mugan Island or Muğan daşı (Russian: Ostrov Svinoy), is an island in the Caspian Sea located south of Baku, Azerbaijan.

Geography
This island lies south of the Baku Archipelago, 16 km off the shore. Svinoy is about 1 km in length and 0.6 km wide. Although geographically quite far from Baku, This island is considered part of the Baku Archipelago.

On Svinoy Island, there is an automatic station for the monitoring of local water pollution.

History

Stenka Razin's Cossacks crushed the fleet of the Safavid Shah Suleiman I of Persia in the waters off Svinoy Island in 1669.
The southern bay of the island is an ideal place for underwater archaeology.

References

External links
Impact of Natural Hazards on Oil and Gas Extraction

Islands of Azerbaijan
Islands of the Caspian Sea
Uninhabited islands of Azerbaijan